The zucchini (plural: zucchini or zucchinis), courgette (plural: courgettes) or baby marrow (Cucurbita pepo) is a summer squash, a vining herbaceous plant whose fruit are harvested when their immature seeds and epicarp (rind) are still soft and edible. It is closely related, but not identical, to the marrow; its fruit may be called marrow when mature.

Ordinary zucchini fruit are any shade of green, though the golden zucchini is a deep yellow or orange.

In botany, the zucchini's fruit is a pepo, a berry (the swollen ovary of the zucchini flower) with a hardened epicarp. In cookery, it is treated as a vegetable, usually cooked and eaten as an accompaniment or savory dish, though occasionally used in sweeter cooking.

Zucchini occasionally contain toxic cucurbitacins, making them extremely bitter, and causing severe gastero-enteric upsets. Causes include stressed growing conditions, and cross pollination with ornamental squashes.

Zucchini descends from squashes first domesticated in Mesoamerica over 7,000 years ago, but the zucchini itself was bred in Milan in the late 19th century.

Naming and etymology

The plant has three names in English, all of them meaning 'small marrow': zucchini (an Italian loanword), usually used in the plural form even when only one zucchina is meant, courgette (a French loanword), and baby marrow (South African English). Zucchini and courgette are doublets, both descending from the Latin .

Zucchini 
The name zucchini is used in American, Australian, Canadian and New Zealand English.

In Italian, the masculine  is attested earlier and hence preferred by the Accademia della Crusca, the Italian language regulator. The feminine  is also found, and preferred by the Italian-language encyclopedia Treccani, which considers  to be a Tuscan Dialect word.

Zucchini is also used in Canadian French, Danish, German, and Swedish.

Courgette 
The name courgette is used in British, Hiberno-, Malaysian, New Zealand, and South African English. Courgette is also used in Dutch.

Baby marrow 
The name baby marrow is used in South Africa to name a zucchini harvested when extremely immature, the size of an index finger.

Flower

The female flower is a golden blossom on the end of each emergent zucchini. The male flower grows directly on the stem of the zucchini plant in the leaf axils (where leaf petiole meets stem), on a long stalk, and is slightly smaller than the female. Both flowers are edible and are often used to dress a meal or to garnish the cooked fruit.

Firm and fresh blossoms that are only slightly open are cooked to be eaten, with pistils removed from female flowers, and stamens removed from male flowers. The stems on the flowers can be retained as a way of giving the cook something to hold onto during cooking, rather than injuring the delicate petals, or they can be removed prior to cooking, or prior to serving. There are a variety of recipes in which the flowers may be deep fried as fritters or tempura (after dipping in a light tempura batter), stuffed, sautéed, baked, or used in soups.

History
Zucchini, like all squash, has its ancestry in the Americas, specifically Mesoamerica. However, the varieties of green, cylindrical squash harvested immature and typically called "zucchini" were cultivated in northern Italy, as much as three centuries after the introduction of cucurbits from the Americas. It appears that this occurred in the second half of the 19th century, although the first description of the variety under the name zucchini occurs in a work published in Milan in 1901. Early varieties usually appended the names of nearby cities in their names.

The first records of zucchini in the United States date to the early 1920s. It was almost certainly taken to America by Italian immigrants and probably was first cultivated in the United States in California. A 1928 report on vegetables grown in New York State treats 'Zucchini' as one among 60 cultivated varieties of C. pepo.

Culinary uses

When used for food, zucchini are usually picked when under  in length, when the seeds are still soft and immature. These larger ones often have mature seeds and hard skins, requiring peeling and seeding. A zucchini with the flowers attached is a sign of a truly fresh and immature fruit, and it is especially sought after for its sweeter flavor.

Zucchini is usually served cooked. It can be prepared using a variety of cooking techniques, including steamed, boiled, grilled, stuffed and baked, barbecued, fried, or incorporated in other recipes such as soufflés. Zucchini can also be baked into a zucchini bread, similar to banana bread, or incorporated into a cake mix to make zucchini cake, similar to carrot cake. Its flowers can be eaten stuffed and are a delicacy when deep fat fried (e.g., tempura).

Zucchini has a delicate flavor and can be found simply cooked with butter or olive oil and herbs, or in more complex dishes. The skin is usually left in place. When frying zucchini, it is recommended to pat down cut sections to make them drier, similarly to what may be done with eggplant, in order to keep the slices’ shape while cooking. Zucchini can also be eaten raw, sliced or shredded, in a cold salad, as well as lightly cooked in hot salads, as in Thai or Vietnamese recipes. Mature (larger sized) zucchini are well suited for cooking in breads.

Zucchinis can be cut with a spiralizer into noodle-like spirals and used as a low-carbohydrate substitute for pasta or noodles, often referred to as 'Zoodles'.

In Australia, a popular dish is a frittatalike dish called zucchini slice.

In Bulgaria, zucchini may be fried and then served with a dip, made from yogurt, garlic, and dill. Another popular dish is oven-baked zucchini—sliced or grated—covered with a mixture of eggs, yogurt, flour, and dill.

In Egypt, zucchini may be cooked with tomato sauce, garlic, and onions.

In France, zucchini is a key ingredient in ratatouille, a stew of summer vegetable-fruits and vegetables prepared in olive oil and cooked for an extended time over low heat. The dish, originating near present-day Nice, is served as a side dish or on its own at lunch with bread. Zucchini may be stuffed with meat or with other fruits such as tomatoes or bell peppers in a dish called courgette farcie (stuffed zucchini).

In Greece, zucchini is usually fried, stewed or boiled with other fruits (often green chili peppers and eggplants). It is served as an hors d'œuvre or as a main dish, especially during fasting seasons. Zucchini is also stuffed with minced meat, rice, and herbs and served with avgolemono sauce. In several parts of Greece, the flowers of the plant are stuffed with white cheese, usually feta or mizithra, or with a mixture of rice, herbs, and occasionally minced meat. They are then deep-fried or baked in the oven with tomato sauce.

In Italy, zucchini is served in a variety of ways: fried, baked, boiled, or deep fried, alone or in combination with other ingredients. At home and in some restaurants, it is possible to eat the flowers, as well, deep-fried, known as fiori di zucca (cf. pumpkin flower fritter).

In the cuisines of the former Ottoman Empire, zucchini is often stuffed and called dolma. It is also used in various stews, both with and without meat, including ladera.

In Mexico, the flower (known as flor de calabaza) is often cooked in soups or used as a filling for quesadillas. The fruit is used in stews, soups (i.e. caldo de res, de pollo, or de pescado, mole de olla, etc.) and other preparations. The flower, as well as the fruit, is eaten often throughout Latin America.

In Russia, Ukraine and other CIS countries, zucchini usually is coated in flour or semolina and then fried or baked in vegetable oil, served with sour cream. Another popular recipe is "zucchini caviar", a squash spread made from thermically processed zucchini, carrots, onions and tomato paste, produced either at home or industrially as a vegetable preserve.

In Turkey, zucchini is the main ingredient in the popular dish mücver, or "zucchini pancakes", made from shredded zucchini, flour, and eggs, lightly fried in olive oil and eaten with yogurt. They are also often used in kebabs along with various meats. The flowers are also used in a cold dish, where they are stuffed with a rice mix with various spices and nuts and stewed.

In the United States, fried zucchini was invented in Pittsburgh.

In 2005, a poll of 2,000 people revealed it to be Britain's 10th favorite culinary vegetable.

Stuffed zucchini is found in many cuisines. Typical stuffings in the Middle Eastern family of dolma include rice, onions, tomato, and sometimes meat.

Nutrition

Toxicology
Members of the plant family Cucurbitaceae, which includes zucchini / marrows, pumpkins and cucumbers, can contain toxins called cucurbitacins. These are steroids which defend the plants from predators, and have a bitter taste to humans. Cultivated cucurbitaceae are bred for low levels of the toxin and are safe to eat. However, ornamental pumpkins can have high levels of cucurbitacins, and such ornamental plants can cross-fertilize edible cucurbitaceae—any such cross-fertilized seeds used by the gardener for growing food in the following season can therefore potentially produce bitter and toxic fruit. Dry weather or irregular watering can also favor the production of the toxin, which is not destroyed by cooking. Humans with an impaired sense of taste (particularly the elderly) should therefore ask a younger person to taste the zucchini for them. This toxin has caused at least one death of an elderly person, in 2015. Investigators warned that gardeners should not save their own seeds, as reversion to forms containing more poisonous cucurbitacin might occur.

Zucchini can also be responsible for allergy caused by the presence of a protein: profilin. The sap released when peeling young zucchini also contains a viscous substance which when drying on the hands gives the impression of super-glue and dry hands.

Cultivation

 Zucchini is very easy to cultivate in temperate climates. As such, it has a reputation among home gardeners for overwhelming production. The part harvested as "zucchini" is the immature fruit, although the flowers, mature fruit, and leaves are eaten, as well. One good way to control overabundance is to harvest the flowers, which are an expensive delicacy in markets because of the difficulty in storing and transporting them. The male flower is borne on the end of a stalk and is longer-lived.

While easy to grow, zucchini, like all squash, requires plentiful bees for pollination. In areas of pollinator decline or high pesticide use, such as mosquito-spray districts, gardeners often experience fruit abortion, where the fruit begins to grow, then dries or rots. This is due to an insufficient number of pollen grains delivered to the female flower. It can be corrected by hand pollination or by increasing the bee population.

Closely related to zucchini are Lebanese summer squash or kusa (not to be confused with cushaw), but they often are lighter green or even white. Some seed catalogs do not distinguish them. Various varieties of round zucchinis are grown in different countries under different names, such as "Tondo di Piacenza" in Italy, "Qarabaghli" in Malta and "Ronde de Nice" in France. In the late 1990s, American producers in California cultivated and began marketing round yellow and green zucchini known as "8-ball" squash (the yellow ones are sometimes known as "1-ball" or "gold ball"). White zucchini (summer squash) is sometimes seen as a mutation and can appear on the same plant as its green counterpart.

Cultivars
 Bianco di Trieste
 Black Beauty, very dark green
 Cocozelle, dark green with white stripes, heirloom

See also
 Aehobak (Korean zucchini)

References

External links

 Method for hand pollinating zucchini, Green Change

Fruit vegetables
Squashes and pumpkins